The Pregnant Papa is a 1989 Hungarian comedy film directed by Dezső Garas.

Cast 
 Ferenc Kállai - Béla, the president of the council
 Károly Eperjes - Józsi
 Judit Pogány - Rozi, Józsi's mom
 Dezső Garas - Béla, Józsi's dad
  - Béla, the director
  - Béla, the priest
 Enikő Eszenyi - Ágika
 Péter Andorai - Béla, the doctor
 Ádám Szirtes - Old peasant

References

External links 

1989 comedy films
1989 films
Hungarian comedy films
1980s Hungarian-language films